The Corporate sector of Pakistan (otherwise attributed as the Corporatization; or/ simply referred to as the Pakistan Inc.) is an elite business sector expanded in financial cities of Pakistan, and a policy measure programme in the economic period of Pakistan. This programme is also regarded as "Pakistan Inc.", which is a common term used by the mass-media of Pakistan to refer to the corporate sector of the nation. The current policy measure programme is the Companies Ordinance 2016 that legally allows a variety of formations in the mixed economy of Pakistan. 

The programme was originally based on the Companies Act, 1913, which was replaced by the Companies Ordinance 1984, finally being replaced by the current Companies Ordinance 2016 in a vision to promote Western-styled corporate sector, and business activities development in Pakistan.  The corporate sector came in direct response to nationalization programme of executed Prime Minister Zulfiqar Ali Bhutto and the Pakistan Peoples Party to promote . This programme was integrated in Privatization programme of Prime minister Nawaz Sharif in 1990 who gave free hand to private sector to expand the economical activities in the country. The corporate sector remained to expand in Prime minister Benazir Bhutto's government who promoted the nationalization and privatization at once. In 2004, in a programme initiated by Prime minister Shaukat Aziz, the corporate sector further enhanced and matured; it had built a strong and sizeable sector in the financial hubs of the country. 

Under Aziz, many of state-owned megacorporations along with private sector had been registered in stock exchanges of the country in order to promote business competition in the country.

Growth trend
The Securities and Exchange Commission of Pakistan has registered 920 new companies in the first quarter of 2005. The Company Registration Office at Lahore registered the most number of companies at 324, CRO Karachi 285 companies, and CRO Islamabad 211 companies.

Of the 920 companies, 898 were limited by shares comprising 21 public unlisted companies, 840 private companies, and 37 single member companies. In addition, the Commission also registered 11 foreign companies, 9 associations not-for-profit and 2 companies limited by guarantee. Total authorized capital and paid up capital of the companies limited by shares amounted to Rs.50 billion and Rs.2 billion, respectively. 

The services sector recorded 161 new incorporations, followed by 121 in trading, 64 in Information Technology, 59 in communication, 50 in fuel and energy, 49 in the real estate development, 38 in construction and 37 in textile sector. The SECP encourages and facilitates corporatisation of all businesses so that the corporate sector contributes towards the economic development of the country.

As of 2005, the Board of Investment estimates that there were 43,965 corporate enterprises registered in Pakistan as detailed below:

See also
Board of Investment
Securities and Exchange Commission of Pakistan
Karachi Stock Exchange
List of Pakistani companies
Islam in Pakistan

References

Documentation

Companies of Pakistan
Economic history of Pakistan